Hubert Jerzy Kostka (born 27 May 1940 in Ratibor) is a retired Polish football goalkeeper. Kostka participated in the 1972 Summer Olympics in Munich, where Poland won the men's football tournament. Kostka is not only a successful player, he also was a manager and graduated as a mining engineer from the Silesian Polytechnic in Gliwice.

Club career
His career began at small club LZS Markowice, but soon he was purchased by Unia Racibórz, and in the fall of 1960 he moved to Górnik Zabrze, a powerhouse of Polish football. He spent 14 years at the club, playing 301 games in all competitions. With Górnik, he was 8 times champion of Poland as well as finishing runners-up in the 1970 Cup Winners' Cup final to Manchester City.

International career
Kostka also was a starting goalkeeper for the Poland national team. In the 1972 Summer Olympics him and his team won the gold medal in the men's football tournament, but soon afterwards the aging goalkeeper was replaced by another star, Jan Tomaszewski. Between 1962 and 1972  he played in 32 international matches, captaining the team on 4 occasions.

International

Post-playing career
After retiring from playing, he started managing. He was the Poland national team assistant in 1974. His first job as the main manager was with Górnik Zabrze Youth. In 1976 he took over as manager of Górnik's first team. Later, he worked with Szombierki Bytom, winning the 1979–80 Ekstraklasa title. In the mid-1980s Kostka returned to Zabrze, winning the Ekstraklasa twice, in 1984–85 and 1985–86. He also helped Kazimierz Górski, Jacek Gmoch and Antoni Piechniczek with preparations for the 1970 FIFA World Cup. He graduated as a mining engineer from the Silesian Polytechnic University in Gliwice.

He continued managing until 2000, when he retired from Włókniarz Kietrz.

References

1940 births
Living people
People from Racibórz
People from the Province of Upper Silesia
Polish footballers
Poland international footballers
Association football goalkeepers
Footballers at the 1972 Summer Olympics
Olympic footballers of Poland
Olympic gold medalists for Poland
Górnik Zabrze players
Polish football managers
Górnik Zabrze managers
FC Aarau managers
Lechia Gdańsk managers
Szombierki Bytom managers
Raków Częstochowa managers
Olympic medalists in football
Sportspeople from Silesian Voivodeship
Medalists at the 1972 Summer Olympics